The 2013–14 Momentum One Day Cup was a domestic one-day cricket championship in South Africa. It was the 33rd time the championship was contested. The competition started on 10 October 2013 and the final took place on 15 November 2013 at Newlands Cricket Ground in Cape Town. The trophy was shared by the Cape Cobras and the Titans when the final was abandoned after fewer than 6 over were completed (and the reserve day was completely abandoned) due to rain.

Group stage

Points table

RESULT POINTS:

 Win – 4
 Tie – 2 each
 No Result – 2 each
 Loss – 0

Knockout stage
Of the 6 participants, the following 3 teams qualified for the knockout stage:

Semi-final

Final

Statistics

Most Runs

Source: Cricinfo

Most Wickets

Source: Cricinfo

External links
 Series home at ESPN Cricinfo

References 

South African domestic cricket competitions
Momentum One Day Cup